Rusununguko Secondary School is situated under Munyanyi village in ward 10 under Chief Ndanga in Shurugwi District. The school was established in 1981 after the end of the liberation struggle and the gain of independence of Zimbabwe. It attained its name 'Rusununguko' which is a Shona word to mean freedom which the country got after the independence on 18 April 1980. Before its establishment, the only school which was in this area was Ndawora Primary School, the then St Pauls primary during the liberation struggle.

It must not be confused with Rusunguko High School near Melfort, Bromley and Marondera.

During the construction of this school, secondary students were accommodated under trees at Ndawora primary school which is on the side of the river Mutorahuku which divides these two schools.

During the black empowerment efforts and education for all which were initiated by President Robert Mugabe, Rusununguko became a high school with the first A level stream starting in 2004. At the same time, the President donated 10 computers which saw the school using computers for the first time since its establishment. A great performance was produced by the students on that stream as there were 4 students who scored 10 points which was not expected as they started A level without enough teachers and study materials. During the 1990s, Rusununguko secondary was rated one of the best day schools in Shurugwi district with a third award which they earned in 1999 for best O level performance. Since the establishment of A level the pass rate was over 75% with the highest record of 14 points recorded in 2007 with Alfred Shumba one of the former students and a minimum of 0 points recorded on several occasions. Now Rusununguko is accommodating students who come from the surrounding communities and school for both A level and O level. It is rated higher than the surrounding schools at O level even though its pass rate is very poor, average 7% but the performance is quite good for A level. Rusununguko has recorded the highest past rate ever for A level of above 90% in 2010 though the highest points recorded that year were 12 points from a couple of students.

The school offers commercial and arts subjects at A level and O level and it is likely that in the coming 5 or more years it may start offering sciences. Since the establishment of the school in 1981, it has recruited students which exceed 10,000 students which has been a result of the introduction of A level classes, with the increasing number leading to a shortage of classes.

Rusununguko was one of the rural schools which were visited by the Romanian ambassador in 2006 and the former United States of America ambassador to Zimbabwe Charles Ray in 2012.

See also

 List of schools in Zimbabwe
 List of boarding schools

High schools in Zimbabwe
Boarding schools in Zimbabwe
1981 establishments in Zimbabwe
Educational institutions established in 1981
Education in Midlands Province